Cubas de la Sagra is a municipality of the autonomous community of Madrid in central Spain. It belongs to the natural comarca of La Sagra. The Church of San Andrés Apóstol stands in the town.

References

External links

Municipalities in the Community of Madrid